In enzymology, a peptide-aspartate beta-dioxygenase, a member of the alpha-ketoglutarate-dependent hydroxylases superfamily, is an enzyme that catalyzes the chemical reaction

peptide-L-aspartate + 2-oxoglutarate + O2  peptide-3-hydroxy-L-aspartate + succinate + CO2

The 3 substrates of this enzyme are peptide-L-aspartate, 2-oxoglutarate, and O2, whereas its 3 products are peptide-3-hydroxy-L-aspartate, succinate, and CO2.

It employs one cofactor, iron.

Nomenclature 

This enzyme belongs to the family of oxidoreductases, specifically those acting on paired donors, with O2 as oxidant and incorporation or reduction of oxygen. The oxygen incorporated need not be derived from O2 with 2-oxoglutarate as one donor, and incorporation of one atom o oxygen into each donor.  The systematic name of this enzyme class is peptide-L-aspartate,2-oxoglutarate:oxygen oxidoreductase (3-hydroxylating). Other names in common use include aspartate beta-hydroxylase, and aspartylpeptide beta-dioxygenase.

References

Further reading section 

 

Human 2OG oxygenases
EC 1.14.11
Iron enzymes
Enzymes of known structure